Mayville is a historic train station located at Mayville in Chautauqua County, New York. It was constructed in 1925, for the Pennsylvania Railroad and is a -story, brick structure with an overhanging hipped roof.  The building measures .  The station had were Pennsylvania Railroad trains on a route north to Dunkirk and then to Buffalo. To the south, the routed went to Corry and Oil City and then to Pittsburgh. From the station, travelers to resorts along Chautauqua Lake made connections to interurbans and large fleets of steamboats. The Chautauqua Traction Company served the communities on the western side of the lake; and the Jamestown, Westfield and Northwestern Railroad served the eastern side of the lake.

By August, 1949, the Pennsylvania Railroad had abandoned its service on the route north of Corry, thus isolating the station. It was abandoned by the Pennsylvania Railroad in 1950. The property was purchased by the Village of Mayville in 1968.

From June 1995 until the fall of 2000 the building served as a local access cable television studio.  The Chautauqua Town Historical Society now operates part of the station as the Mayville Depot Museum, which features exhibits of local history, railroad artifacts, Chautauqua Lake, ice harvesting, furniture manufacturing and steamboats.

It was listed on the National Register of Historic Places in 1993 as the Pennsylvania Railroad Station.

References

External links
Mayville Depot Museum and Chautauqua Township Historical Society Museum
Mayville Train Station - Mayville, NY - Train Stations/Depots on Waymarking.com

Railway stations in the United States opened in 1925
Railway stations on the National Register of Historic Places in New York (state)
Mayville
Transportation buildings and structures in Chautauqua County, New York
Museums in Chautauqua County, New York
Historical society museums in New York (state)
Railroad museums in New York (state)
National Register of Historic Places in Chautauqua County, New York
Former railway stations in New York (state)